Gola Gokaran Nath or Gola is the city, municipal board, thana and tehsil in Lakhimpur Kheri district in the Indian state of Uttar Pradesh.

Gola Gokaran Nath is famous for its Shiva Temple and BHL sugar mill. Gola Gokaran Nath is also popularly known as Chhoti Kashi (Little Kashi).

Demographics 

 India census,  Gola Gokaran Nath has a population of 60,172, of which 31,415 are males while 28,757 are females. Population of Children with age of 0-6 is 6740 which is 11.20% of total population of Gola Gokaran Nath (NPP). In Gola Gokaran Nath Nagar Palika Parishad, female sex ratio is of 915 against state average of 912. Moreover, child sex ratio in Gola Gokaran Nath is around 891 compared to Uttar Pradesh state average of 902. Literacy rate of Gola Gokaran Nath city is 81.85% higher than state average of 67.68%. In Gola Gokaran Nath, Male literacy is around 86.24% while female literacy rate is 77.07%.

historical significance 
During the great war of Ramayana in Treta Yuga Ravana pleased Lord Shiva with his penance so that he could win the war against Lord Rama. Lord Shiva took the shape of a Shiv-ling and directed him to install that Shiva-ling in Lanka. But Lord Shiva proposed the condition that Shiv-Ling should not be put on the Earth on its way to Lanka. But on the way back, Ravana had to give the Shiva-ling to a shepherd to attend nature's call. Shiva increased the weight of the Shiva-ling, so the shepherd had to give up and put the Ling on the ground. This made Ravana very angry as he understood the trickery of Lord Shiva. Ravana realised that Lord Shiva did not want the Ling to be carried to Lanka and let Ravana win the war. Enraged Ravana pressed the Ling with his thumb resulting in an impression which looked like a cow's ear (गौ-कर्ण). It is on this basis that the place was named Gola Gokaran Nath.

Geography 
Gola Gokaran Nath is situated at 28.08° N 80.47° E. Gola Gokran Nath is a small city located at the banks of Sarayan river. It is surrounded by dense tropical forest. It is the second biggest town of Lakhimpur Kheri district.

Politics 
It is part of the Gola Gokrannath Assembly constituency.

Industry 
Gola is home to one of the most prominent sugar mills in Asia. Bajaj Hindusthan Limited is situated in the northern part.

The site selected for the first plant was at Gola Gokaran Nath in the district Lakhimpur Kheri in the Terai region of Uttar Pradesh (UP), an area rich in sugar cane. The original capacity of the factory was 400 tons of cane crushed per day (TCD). Subsequently, this capacity was increased in stages and is currently 13,000 TCD. The distillery unit at this plant commenced production during the end of World War II in 1944. In the initial few years, the major output was in the form of power alcohol as an additive to petrol, which was then in short supply. The unit was the first to supply alcohol-mixed petrol to the army.

Landmarks 

Gola is famous for its Shiva Temple. Many people come here from distant places to visit the temple and get a sight of the holy place. It is difficult to find space in the temple during the Hindu holy month of Shravan. Other areas of religious significance are Lakshmi-Narayan temple and Bhoot Nath temple near Degree College. There are many colleges and schools. There are many markets like Tirth colony, Lakshmi Nagar Colony, Tiwari Market at Mill Road, Punjabi colony, Purvi Dixitana, Paschimi Dixitana, Sarvoday Nagar, Kumharan Tola, Arjun Nagar Colony, Bharat Bhushan Colony, Virendra Nagar Colony, Munnuganj, Oonchi Bhood, and Neechi Bhood. Tirth Bazaar is primarily a ladies' shopping domain consisting of shops for bangles, makeup/cosmetics items and Holy books etc.

Transport

Rail
This City lies on Broad Gauge (Lucknow Division of North-Eastern railway) connecting Gorakhpur, Gonda, Lucknow, Sitapur, Lakhimpur, Pilibhit, Bareilly, Kasganj by Lucknow-Sitapur-Lakhimpur-Pilibhit-Bareilly, Kasganj Line. The Line was converted from Meter Gauge to Broad Gauge in February 2020. There are direct trains to Lucknow, Barabanki, Gonda, Sitapur, Lakhimpur and Gorakhpur.

Road
This city lies on National Highway 730. Gola Gokaran Nath can be reached directly from Lucknow [], Bareilly [], Pilibhit [], Shahjahanpur [] The town is well connected through National & State Highways passing through it. Regular Ordinary buses/AC Shatabdi Buses runs from Delhi, Lucknow, Lakhimpur, Pilibhit, Shahjahanpur and Bareilly are available for Gola Gokarannath round the clock.

Air
Direct flights are available to and from Mumbai, Delhi, Bangalore, Jaipur, Pune and other important cities of the country.

See also
 Londonpur

References 

Cities and towns in Lakhimpur Kheri district